Norbert Sinner (5 April 1907 – 9 November 1945) was a Luxembourgian cyclist. He competed in the individual and team road race events at the 1928 Summer Olympics. During the German occupation of Luxembourg during World War II, Sinner worked as an oil wholesaler, and supported the Nazis during the invasion. He was one of the first members of the pro-Nazi Volksdeutsche Bewegung in Luxembourg, and in October 1940 he became Ortsgruppenleiter of Haute. After the war ended, he was executed for his collaboration with the Nazis.

References

External links
 

1907 births
1945 deaths
People from Leudelange
Luxembourgian male cyclists
Olympic cyclists of Luxembourg
Cyclists at the 1928 Summer Olympics
20th-century executions by Luxembourg
Executed Luxembourgian collaborators with Nazi Germany